Simhada Mari is a 1997 Indian Kannada-language action drama film directed by Om Prakash Rao and produced by Ramu. The film stars Shiva Rajkumar, Telugu actor Krishnam Raju and debutant Simran. The flash back portion which is considered to be the heart of this movie went on to be used in the Telugu movie Aadi. The film's score and soundtrack was scored by Hamsalekha and the cinematography was by T. Janardhan.

Synopsis 
Vishwas frequently rebels against the injustice suffered by the poor and weak at the hands of rich people. Soon, he finds that his father was murdered and seeks vengeance.

Cast 
 Shiva Rajkumar as Vishwa / Vishwanatha Simha 
 Simran as Usha, Vishwa's love interest 
 Krishnam Raju as Dharmadhikari Veerendra Simha 
 Ambika as Vishwa's mother 
 Dheerendra Gopal as Shiva 
 Vajramuni as Bhupathi 
 Sudheer as Venkatesha 
 Tennis Krishna as Tennis Krishna 
 Avinash as Vishwa's Caretaker 
 B. V. Radha as Usha's mother 
 Honnavalli Krishna as Honnavalli 
 Vinayak Joshi as young Peter 
 Master Anand as Young Vishwa's friend 
 Jyothi Meena - special appearance in item dancer in song "Dhekore Dhekore"

Production 
The scene in the film had ten stuntmen jump down from a height of 20 feet in police shoes and all had their legs fractured and also camera operator Viji died on the spot.
Simran, then a new actress, was chosen for the female lead role. Popular Telugu actor Krishnam Raju was chosen to play a pivotal role making his debut in Kannada films.

Soundtrack 

The soundtrack of the film was composed by Hamsalekha and the audio was bought by Lahari Music.

Box-office  
The movie ran for 150 days at few centres across the Karnataka.

References 

1997 films
1990s Kannada-language films
Indian action films
Indian films about revenge
Films scored by Hamsalekha
1990s masala films
Films directed by Om Prakash Rao
1997 action films